Simon Christopher Joseph Fraser, 16th Lord Lovat and 5th Baron Lovat (born 13 February 1977), has been the chief of Clan Fraser of Lovat since the death of his grandfather in 1995.

Titles
While legally being 16th Lord Lovat, he is commonly referred to as the 18th Lord, and also as the 25th MacShimidh (Gaelic: "son of Simon"), the traditional title of the Chiefs of Clan Fraser. He also holds the feudal title Baron of Castlehill.

Early life
Lord Lovat is the son of Simon Fraser, Master of Lovat, and his wife, Virginia (née Grose). He is the grandson of the 15th Lord Lovat. He has two older sisters, Violet (b. 1972) and Honor (b. 1973), and one younger brother, John (b. 1984). Honor Fraser is a former fashion model.

Simon attended Harrow School, and graduated from the University of Edinburgh.

Whilst still at Harrow, he assumed the title of Lord Lovat on the death of his grandfather in 1995. His father Simon (then Master of Lovat and heir to the title) had died the previous year whilst riding on a hunt at the family's Beaufort estate. Due to considerable debts, the family was forced to sell Beaufort Castle.

He lost his seat in the House of Lords in 1999, when the law was changed to exclude most hereditary peers from the House.

Later life
Lovat became a stockbroker, and worked for a time in Geneva before moving to London. He currently works as a commodities analyst.

He married Petra Palumbo in May 2016, at St Stephen Walbrook, a church in London. She is the daughter of Peter Palumbo, Baron Palumbo. They have a daughter.

References

External links

1977 births
Alumni of the University of Edinburgh
Barons in the Peerage of the United Kingdom
Living people
People educated at Harrow School
British stockbrokers
Clan Fraser Chiefs
Clan Fraser
Fraser, Simon Fraser, 8th Lord
Lords Lovat

Lovat